Fire-retardant fabrics are textiles that are more resistant to fire than others through chemical treatment of flame-retardant or manufactured fireproof fibers.

Properties
The term fire-retardant as applied to organic (i.e., containing carbon) materials, is intended to refer to reduced fire hazard, as all will burn under certain circumstances. The tests used specified in building codes, such as NFPA 701, are more correctly flame resistance tests, which test a fabric's ability to resist ignition with the flame size and duration in the test conditions. The result is a comparative test, which provides a measure of the material's resistance to propagating combustion caused by small scale ignition sources. These tests do not predict the burning characteristics of full scale hazards. In many cases, if exposed to a sufficiently large and sustained exposure fire, the fire-retardant fabrics will burn vigorously. Polyester is inherently flame retardant, and therefore doesn't flare up when applied to various tests. Any amount of heat delivered within a long enough time interval will have no impact on the fabrics' integrity while a limited amount of heat delivered within short enough time interval may ignite or melt the fabric.

Curtains

Inherently flame-retardant fabrics are certified in the United Kingdom by various British Standards. Fire-retardant fabrics sold in the UK for use as curtains must abide by BS 5867 Part 2 B & C, a British Standard. Other relevant UK standards include BS 5815-1 2005, BS 7175, Crib 5, IMO A563 and NFPA 701.

Stage drapery
Fabric flammability is an important textile issue, especially for stage drapery that will be used in a public space such as a school, theatre or special event venue. In the United States, Federal regulations require that drapery fabrics used in such spaces be certified as flame or fire-retardant. For draperies and other fabrics used in public places, this is known as the NFPA 701 Test, which follows standards developed by the National Fire Protection Association (NFPA). Although all fabrics will burn, some are naturally more resistant to fire than others. Those that are more flammable can have their fire resistance drastically improved by treatment with fire-retardant chemicals.

Inherently flame-retardant fabrics such as certain brand polyesters are commonly used for flame retardant curtain fabrics.

Fire-retardancy fabric treatment

Fire-retardant fabrics are normally treated to different British Standards; normally this depends on the end usage of the fabrics. BS 476 is a fire treatment for fabrics that are normally for wall hanging, and must only be used as for that purpose, where as CRIB 5 is a fabric fire treatment for upholstery and must only be used for furnishing and upholstery purposes,  even if both fabrics have been treated for fire-retardancy.
The relevant standards for fire-retardant fabrics include:
 BS 5852:2006 describes the best practice methods to assess the ignitability of single material combinations, such as covers and fillings used in upholstered seating, or complete items of seating. These tests determine the effects of a smouldering cigarette, or other flaming ignition sources such as burning matches or a four-sheet full-size newspaper. This standard can be used to establish the potential ignitability of components in conjunction with other specified materials. BS 5852:2006 first looks at the criteria of ignition, and the health and safety of operators. It then explains the various apparatus, before focussing on smouldering ignition sources – such as a cigarette, butane gas flames and flaming wooden cribs. It also looks at ways to test for the ignitability of upholstery composites and complete items of furniture. The standard concludes with a final examination and test report. BS 5852:2006 replaces the older certification standard, BS 5852 - 1990.
It relates to curtains, blinds and drapes for windows when tested by the methods specified in BS 5438:1976. Where appropriate, a cleansing or wetting procedure specified in BS 5651 may also be required.
Source 5 (Crib 5) is related to upholstery and furniture coverings, and is related to BS 5852. The "crib 5 test" uses a small structure (or "crib") made from wooden sticks that are glued together. A lint pad is attached at the bottom and propane-diol is added when it is to be used in to test upholstery. In a test, the "crib" is ignited with a match. To decide whether the test has been passed or not the fabric cover/filling upholstery arrangement is assessed to see whether there is flaming or smoldering on both the outer cover and the interior filling material. Assuming it does not ignite or smolder, the upholstery arrangement will pass the test as "non-ignition". Similar tests include "Source 0" (smouldering cigarette) and "Source 1" (simulated match)tests.
Class 0
Class 1
BS 476

The M1 standard is a European standard that is widely used in Europe only. Most UK fire officers are reluctant to accept MI certification, they prefer BS certificates.

Durability and cleaning of fabric and drapes
When a fabric is designated as inherently fire-retardant, permanently fire-retardant, or durably fire-retardant, the flame retardancy will last for the life of the fabric as it has been woven into the fabric fiber itself. The drapery can be laundered or dry-cleaned as recommended by the drapery manufacturer.  In the case of fabrics that are designated as fire-retardant, that have been topically treated with chemicals, the flame retardancy of the fabric will dissipate over time, particularly with repeated cleaning. As these chemicals are soluble in liquids-either  water or dry cleaning fluid, these fabrics must be dry-cleaned with a non-liquid cleaning agent. The flame retardants work by coating the flammable fabrics with a mineral based barrier, preventing fire from reaching the fibres. 

Typically, the flame retardancy of topically treated fabric is certified for one year, though the actual length of time in which the treatment remains effective will vary based on the number of times the drapery is dry-cleaned and the environmental conditions in the location in which the drapery is used.  It is recommended that topically treated drapery be re-tested for fire-retardancy on an annual basis and re-treated by a qualified professional as needed.

See also
 Marko (fabric)
 BSI Group
 Flame retardant
 Marlan (fabric)
 Technical textile
 Polybenzimidazole Fiber

References

External links
 European Norm EN11612 (heat & flame)
 Flame Retardant Fabric
 National Fire Protection Association
 California State - Office of the State Fire Marshal
 Fire-Resistant Fabric
 Navigating Flame Retardancy Regulations in the US
 Fire Retardancy Definitions including the NFPA 701 Test
 Video: Drapery Fabric Types, Flammability and Flame Retardant Testing

Fire prevention
Fire protection
Flame retardant fabrics